Bracewell LLP is an international law firm based in Houston, Texas, that began in 1945. The firm has approximately 350 lawyers, and has United States offices in New York City, Washington, D.C., Hartford, San Antonio, Seattle, Dallas and Austin, as well as offices in Dubai, and London.

The firm works primarily in the energy, infrastructure, finance and technology sectors, with practices in transactional, litigation, regulatory and government relations matters.

History 
The firm was founded on November 1, 1945, when J. S. Bracewell and his two sons, J. Searcy Bracewell Jr. and Fentress Bracewell, joined with Bert H. Tunks to practice together in Houston under the name of Bracewell & Tunks. Searcy Bracewell was elected to the Texas Senate in 1946, representing Harris County, and ultimately becoming the Majority Leader of the Senate. Fentress Bracewell led the development of the firm, serving as the firm’s first managing partner. Fentress was appointed Houston Port Commissioner in 1968 and chaired the Port of Houston Authority for 15 years. Bert Tunks was appointed a district court judge in 1957 and was later named chief justice of the First Court of Appeals.

Harry W. Patterson joined the firm in 1951, and was made name partner in 1966 as Bracewell & Patterson prospered from the commercial growth of Houston. National expansion began during the 1970s, followed by international expansion later.

On March 31, 2005, former New York City Mayor Rudolph W. Giuliani joined the firm as a name partner, with the firm becoming known as Bracewell & Giuliani. He helped the firm in establishing its New York office. In January 2016, Giuliani left the firm by “amicable agreement,” and the firm was renamed Bracewell LLP.

Client base 
The firm's clients include major energy and natural resource concerns, from conventional energy sources to renewable energy such as solar power and wind power. In 2009, Bracewell's energy practice ranked as the largest in the U.S., according to Law360, with 117 dedicated energy attorneys.

According to one source, because of its broad-based energy experience, "Bracewell has earned a reputation as one of the most powerful law firms in the energy sector."

Notable clients and cases 

 Obtained $1.6 billion in damages for BMC Software in suit against IBM.

 Represented Crescent Real Estate LLC in acquisition of The Crescent.
 Obtained trial victory for Foro Energy in trade secret dispute with Vita International.

 Appointed by U.S. District Judge J. Paul Oetken in 2021 to serve as special master in privilege review in a criminal investigation into Rudy Giuliani’s dealings with Ukrainian officials.
 Advised Kinder Morgan in 2021 in connection with its $1.2 billion acquisition of Stagecoach Gas Services and its four natural gas storage facilities.
 Advised Marubeni Corporation and Aljomaih Energy & Water Company in the 2021 financial closing on the Rabigh 300 MW solar photovoltaic IPP in Saudi Arabia.
 Represented RES in the negotiation and execution of a first-of-its-kind fixed-price, habitat restoration, maintenance and liability transfer agreement with Klamath River Renewal Corporation in 2021.
 Served as bond counsel and company counsel in $181.27 million financing for the TMC3 Collaborative Research Campus.
 Represented Equinor as U.S. counsel in 2020 in its $1.1 billion sale to BP of a 50 percent interest in the Empire Wind project and the Beacon Wind project off the U.S. East Coast.
 Represented Eni in 2020 in connection with its agreement to acquire a 20 percent interest in the Dogger Bank (A and B) 2.4 GW offshore wind farm project from Equinor and SSE.
 Represented Fotowatio Renewable Ventures in 2020 in connection with its second utility-scale battery storage project, in collaboration with UK developer Harmony Energy.
 Represented The Trevor Project in the effort to establish 9-8-8 as the National Suicide Prevention Hotline and to ensure that LGBTQ youth can access specialized services.
 Defended Toshiba Corp., Toshiba America Electronic Components, Inc. and Toshiba America Business Solutions, Inc. against five U.S. patent claims asserted by Monument Peak Ventures, LLC related to facial recognition algorithms, digital marketing, and the capture and manipulation of digital images.
 Represented Kinder Morgan (NYSE: KMI) in the 2019 sale of the U.S. portion of the Cochin Pipeline to Pembina Pipeline Corporation.
 Represented Prosperity Bancshares in 2019 in connection with a definitive merger agreement with LegacyTexas Financial Group.
 Represented AP Energy Holdings in the closing of financing and equity arrangements for the construction of the $1.3 billion South Field Energy project.
 Appointed by Cardinal Timothy Dolan in 2018 to serve as independent reviewer and special counsel to assess the Archdiocese of New York’s compliance with the Charter for the Protection of Children and Young People.
 Represented Hydro One in the $5.3 billion acquisition of Avista in 2017.
 Represented Kinder Morgan's 2014 consolidation of Kinder Morgan Energy Partners LP, Kinder Morgan Management LLC, and El Paso Pipeline Partners LP, the $70 billion deal was the second-largest energy deal when announced.
 Represented Kinder Morgan in connection with its 2011 IPO, the largest IPO in the energy industry in over a decade,

 Represented Apache Corp.'s 2010 acquisition of BP assets in Texas, New Mexico, Canada, and Egypt.

 Represented Cintra Concesiones de Infraestructuras de Transporte, S.A., a subsidiary of the Grupo Ferrovial, in 2007 in its negotiations to operate a toll road as part of the controversial Trans-Texas Corridor.

 Represented Purdue Pharma in 2006 with Rudy Giuliani as the lead counsel during negotiations with federal prosecutors over charges that the pharmaceutical company had misled the public about OxyContin's addictive properties.

Awards and honors 

 Earned 104 practice and individual rankings in Chambers USA 2022, including a Nationwide Band 1 ranking for Oil & Gas (Regulatory & Litigation) for an eighth consecutive year; Band 1 for Texas: Environment for a sixth consecutive year; and Band 1 for Texas: Banking & Finance for 15th consecutive year.
 Earned 42 practice and individual rankings in Chambers Global 2022, including a Band 1 ranking in USA Oil & Gas USA Electricity Finance.

 Earned 12 practice and individual rankings in Chambers UK 2022.
 Earned 112 practice and individual recommendations in Legal 500 US 2022, including a Tier 1 ranking in Energy Regulation: Oil & Gas.
 Earned 35 practice and individual recommendations in Legal 500 UK 2023.
 For the third time, named Infrastructure and Energy Projects Team of the Year at 2021 Middle East Legal Awards. Previously received the award in 2017 and 2018.
 Named 2022 Law360 Texas Powerhouse.

 Named 2020 Law360 Environmental Group of the Year.
 Named Legal Services Provider of the Year at 2018 Petroleum Economist Awards. Previously won the award in 2015.
 Named 2018 Law360 White Collar Group of the Year.
 Named Law360 Energy Group of the Year six times.

Notes

External links 
 Bracewell LLP web site

Law firms established in 1945
Law firms based in Houston
1945 establishments in Texas